KEKB may refer to:

 KEKB (accelerator)
 KEKB (FM), a radio station (99.9 FM) licensed to Fruita, Colorado, United States